Charles Vincent is a history professor and author at Southern University in Louisiana.

Vincent has written about African American legislators in Louisiana during the Reconstruction era as well as the history of Southern University and the town of Scotlandville where it is located. He is a fellow of the Louisiana Historical Association. He was interviewed for an oral history collection. He has written and spolen about Southern University's emergence after the Reconstruction era and its significance as the only Historically Black College and University (HBCU) system in the United States. He has also been a featured speaker on Reconstruction and Louisiana history. He has written book reviews.

Vincent was the first African American to receive a Ph.D in history from LSU. He serves as director of the Mwalimu Institute.

Bibliography
Black Legislators in Louisiana During Reconstruction Louisiana State University Press, 1976
A Centennial History of Southern University and A&M College, 1880-1980
Images of America: Scotlandville Arcadia Publishing, 2015

References

African-American historians
Southern University faculty
Year of birth missing (living people)
Living people
American male non-fiction writers
21st-century African-American people